Apology, The Apology, apologize/apologise, apologist, apologetics, or apologetic may refer to:

Common uses
 Apology (act), an expression of remorse or regret
 Apologia, a formal defense of an opinion, position, or action

Arts, entertainment, and media

Literature
 Apology (Plato), Plato's recording of Socrates' defense at trial
 Apology (Xenophon), Xenophon's version of Socrates' defense
 A Mathematician's Apology (1940), an essay by British mathematician G. H. Hardy
 Apologeticus or Apology (c. AD 197) of Tertullian
 Apologia Pro Vita Sua (1864), a defense of Catholicism by John Henry Newman
 Apology of the Augsburg Confession (1531), a defense of Lutheranism by Philipp Melanchthon

Films and television
 Apology (film) (1986), starring Lesley Ann Warren
 The Apology (film), a documentary about World War II "comfort women"
 "The Apology" (Seinfeld), a television episode

Music
 "Apologize" (Ed Ames song), 1967
 "Apologize" (OneRepublic song), 2007
 "Apology", a song by Lazlo Bane from the album Back Sides, 2006
 "Apology", a song by The Posies from the album Dear 23, 1990
 "Apologize", a song by Hollywood Undead from the 2011 album American Tragedy
 "Apologize", a song by John Lee Hooker from the album John Lee Hooker Plays & Sings the Blues, 1952
 "Apologize", a 1968 song by Peter, Paul and Mary from the album Late Again
 "Apologize", a song by Grandson (musician)

Religion
 Apologetics, the systematic theological defense of a religious position
 Christian apologetics, the defense of Christianity

Other uses
 Apology (horse) (1871–1888), a British Triple Crown winning Thoroughbred
 The Apology to Australia's Indigenous peoples, also known as The Apology, made by Prime Minister Kevin Rudd in 2008
 Mr. Apology  Allan Bridge (1945–1995), American conceptual artist

See also

 ApologetiX, a Christian parody band founded in 1992
 Apologies to the Queen Mary (2005), an album by Wolf Parade
 "All Apologies", a 1993 song by Nirvana
 I Apologize (disambiguation)
 No Apologies (disambiguation)
 Pranāma, also known as the apology hand gesture, common in India
 Regret (emotion)
 Sorry (disambiguation)

sq:Apologjia